Manmohan Shetty is an Indian entrepreneur who founded and developed Adlabs Films Ltd, one of India’s largest media and entertainment firms.

Biography
Shetty was born and schooled in Mangalore in India to a Tulu-speaking Tuluva Bunt community. He later studied Arts at Mumbai’s Somaiya College and started his career with Adlabs.

Adlabs Films Ltd
Shetty founded his first company Adlabs Films Ltd. as an advertising films processing company in 1976. Soon, the firm ventured into feature film processing by setting up a state-of-the-art laboratory in Film City, Mumbai.

He produced films like Ardh Satya, Chakra, Hip Hip Hurray, Holi and more. In the meantime Adlabs Films Ltd. went on to win the National Award several times for their technical contribution in Indian cinema. At first it did films for advertising; the first feature film it processed was Masoom, a Shekhar Kapoor film.  Eventually it grew to be control the processing of almost 90% of the Hindi film industry. It specialized in enhancing 16mm films to 35 mm format. It won several national awards as best film processing laboratory.

The company went public in 2000 and expanded into the film exhibition business. They launched India’s first and largest IMAX dome in 2001 at Wadala, Mumbai, and later before introducing the multiplex culture to India. Adlabs had close to 100 screens and a market capitalization of approximately $1 billion in 2008. The company has been renamed to Reliance Mediaworks Limited in 2009.

Walkwater Media Ltd. 
Shetty established Walkwater Media Ltd in 2007. It is an integrated business encompassing production across films, television, animation, other media as well as intellectual property exploitation. His two daughters, Pooja Shetty-Deora and Aarti Shetty are associated with the company. Pooja is the joint managing director; Aarti is the creative head of its Film Production Division. Both of them produced the 2010 hit film Tere Bin Laden.

Adlabs Imagica 
Shetty started another entertainment project under the name of Adlabs Imagica. Adlabs Imagica is a theme park built at a cost of 1600Cr INR, on a 300-acre site, between Mumbai and Pune on the Mumbai-Pune Expressway. The park has around 500 employees and can accommodate as many as 20,000 visitors. Shetty is targeting to host over above 3 million visitors in the first year of operations.

Other activities 
Shetty is ex-chairman of the National Film Development Corporation. He has been associated as a producer with films like Ardh Satya, Chakra, Hip Hip Hurray, Aaghat and Holi. His production company, Entertainment One, has produced films like Gangaajal, Main Madhuri Dixit Banna Chahti Hoon, Inteha and Munnabhai MBBS.

Filmography
Chakra (1981)
 Ardh Satya (1983)
Hip Hip Hurray (1984)
Aghaat (1985)
Shrikant (1987)
 Hazaar Chaurasi Ki Maa (1998)
Main Madhuri Dixit Banna Chahti Hoon (2003)
Munnabhai MBBS (2003)
Gangaajal (2003)
Dev (2004)
Dil Jo Bhi Kahey (2005) 
Bluffmaster! (2005)
Waqt (2005)
Apaharan (2005)
Taxi No.9211 (2006)
Shiva (2006)
Darwaza Band Rakho (2006)
Mitti Waajan Mardi (2007) 
Johnny Gaddar (2007)
Khoya Khoya Chand (2007)
Marigold (2007)
Ram Gopal Varma Ki Aag (2007)
Nishabd (2007)
Dil Dosti Etc (2007)
Namastey London (2007)
Singh Is Kinng (2008)

References

External links
 
 Walkwater Official website
 Walkwater Blogspot
 Walkwater Myspace
 Walkwater Wordpress

Living people
Tulu people
Film producers from Karnataka
Hindi film producers
Businesspeople from Mangalore
Year of birth missing (living people)